The Chosen Coal Industry Company (Japanese: 朝鮮石炭工業株式會社 Chōsen Sekitan Kōgyō Kabushiki Kaisha; Korean: 조선석탄공업주식회사 Joseon Seoktaneop Jusikhoesa) was a kabushiki kaisha in colonial Korea that operated collieries in Aoji, Sinaoji and Obong in Gyeongheung County, North Hamgyeong Province. In addition to the mines, after the Chosen Synthetic Oil Company opened a large factory in Aoji-ri (now Haksong-ri) in 1937 to produce synthetic oil from the bituminous coal mined in the area, the Chosen Coal Industry Company built a railway line, called the Ao Line, to connect its mines to the chemical factory and to the South Manchuria Railway's North Chosen East Line, opening the line in two parts in 1938 and 1942.

Following the partition of Korea and the establishment of North Korea, the company was nationalised. The Ao Line, along with all other railway lines in the country, was nationalised on 10 August 1946, becoming part of the Korean State Railway.

References

Rail transport in North Korea
Rail transport in Korea
Defunct railway companies of Korea
Korea under Japanese rule
Defunct companies of Japan
Defunct energy companies of Japan